Ángel Clemente Rojas (born 28 August 1944 in Sarandí), nicknamed Rojitas, is a former Argentine footballer who played most of his career for Boca Juniors.

Rojas started his professional career in 1963 with Boca Juniors at the age of 18, he was hit by a major injury early in his career, a collision with an opposition player caused an Anterior cruciate ligament injury in 1963 kept him on the sidelines until August 1964. He returned to help Boca to claim the 1964 league championship. Boca followed it up with another championship in 1965, Rojas made a contribution of 12 goals, the most he ever scored for Boca in a league season.

In 1965 Rojas was selected to play for the Argentina national football team, he scored a goal on his debut against Chile, but only ever played one more game for La Selección.

In 1969 Boca won the Nacional championship and the Copa Argentina, Rojas played a part in both successes. In 1970 they won another Nacional, Rojas' 4th and last league title with the club.

Rojas left Boca Juniors at the end of 1971, having played 224 games and scored 78 goals in all competitions. In his eight years with the club they won four league titles and an Argentine cup.

Between 1972 and 1973 Rojas played in Peru with Municipal.

In 1974 Rojas returned to Argentina to play for Racing Club, but he only scored one goal for the club in 17 appearances. He then had spells with Nueva Chicago and Club Atlético Lanús before playing out his career at Argentino de Quilmes in 1978.

Titles
 Primera División (4): 1964, 1965, 1969 Nacional, 1970 Nacional
 Copa Argentina (1): 1969

External links

 Informe Xeneize profile
 Esto es Boca profile
 Historia de Boca profile
 

1944 births
Living people
Sportspeople from Avellaneda
Argentine footballers
Argentina international footballers
Association football forwards
Boca Juniors footballers
Racing Club de Avellaneda footballers
Nueva Chicago footballers
Club Atlético Lanús footballers
Deportivo Municipal footballers
Argentine Primera División players
Argentine expatriate footballers
Expatriate footballers in Peru